Poster paint (also known as tempera paint in the US) is a distemper paint that usually uses Starch, Cornstarch, cellulose, gum-water or another glue size as its binder. It either comes in large bottles or jars or in a powdered form. It is normally a cheap paint used in school art classes.

See also

 Gouache
 Tempera, the common name for Poster paint in the US and also a fine art painting material using egg yolk as a binder

References

 Ralph Mayer, The Artist's Handbook of Materials and Techniques, page 231

Paints
Early childhood education in the United States
Children's art